Voice is the first Japanese studio album (and second overall) by South Korean boy band 2AM. The new album contains twelve songs including a song, "無邪気な笑顔で", self-composed by its member Chang Min. Originally in Korean lyrics but for the Japanese album release, the lyrics had been changed to Japanese. The other 3 new songs are  First Love, Pretty Girl and "愛の歌がRadioから". The rest are songs from their 1st to 4th Japanese singles releases in the year 2012: "Never Let You Go: Shindemo Hanasanai", "Denwa ni Denai Kimi ni", "For You: Kimi no Tame ni Dekiru Koto" and "Darenimo Watasenai Yo".

Track listing

Charts

Oricon

References

External links 
 Official Website
 Japanese Official Website

2013 albums
Japanese-language albums
2AM (band) albums
Hybe Corporation albums